The 2004–05 Calgary Flames season was the 25th National Hockey League season in Calgary, its games were cancelled as the 2004–05 NHL lockout could not be resolved in time.  As a result, the Flames were unable to raise their Western Conference Championship banner until the start of 2005–06 season.

NHL lockout
Flames owner, and NHL Chairman of the Board, Harley Hotchkiss was a key figure in the resolution of the labour dispute.  Initially taking a low key role, Hotchkiss was thrust into the spotlight when he was invited by NHLPA president Trevor Linden to last-ditch meeting in January 2005 to save the season.  While that meeting was unsuccessful in resolving the dispute, the two would continue to meet until an agreement was finally hammered out on July 13, 2005.  Hotchkiss' role in the negotiations was prominently mentioned when he was voted into the Hockey Hall of Fame in 2006.

Defenceman Mike Commodore created a stir early on in the lockout when he stated during a radio interview for The Fan 960 in Calgary that he would accept a salary cap if it meant resolving the lockout.  

Commodore was also critical of the leadership of the NHLPA: 

Unlike other players who made similar statements, Commodore never retracted his comments.

During the lockout, the Flames heavily promoted their Western Hockey League team, the Calgary Hitmen.  The result was that the Hitmen obliterated the WHL record for attendance by over 40,000 with a season mark of 362,227.  The mark would also set a CHL record.  The Hitmen's average of 10,062 was the highest average of any junior or professional hockey team in North America.

Schedule

|-
| 1 || September 24 || @ Chicago Blackhawks
|-
| 2 || September 25 || Vancouver Canucks
|-
| 3 || September 28 || Edmonton Oilers
|-
| 4 || September 30 || Chicago Blackhawks
|-
| 5 || October 1 || @ Edmonton Oilers
|-
| 6 || October 3 || @ Edmonton Oilers
|-
| 7 || October 7 || Edmonton Oilers
|-
| 8 || October 8 || @ Vancouver Canucks
|-

|-
| 1 || October 13 || @ Anaheim Mighty Ducks
|-
| 2 || October 15 || @ Los Angeles Kings
|-
| 3 || October 17 || @ Edmonton Oilers
|-
| 4 || October 19 || Vancouver Canucks
|-
| 5 || October 21 || St. Louis Blues
|-
| 6 || October 23 || Columbus Blue Jackets
|-
| 7 || October 26 || @ Vancouver Canucks
|-
| 8 || October 29 || @ Colorado Avalanche
|-
| 9 || October 30 || @ Phoenix Coyotes
|-
| 10 || November 2 || Nashville Predators
|-
| 11 || November 4 || Colorado Avalanche
|-
| 12 || November 6 || Edmonton Oilers
|-
| 13 || November 9 || Anaheim Mighty Ducks
|-
| 14 || November 11 || @ Tampa Bay Lightning
|-
| 15 || November 12 || @ Florida Panthers
|-
| 16 || November 14 || @ Carolina Hurricanes
|-
| 17 || November 18 || Nashville Predators
|-
| 18 || November 20 || Chicago Blackhawks
|-
| 19 || November 23 || @ St. Louis Blues
|-
| 20 || November 24 || @ Detroit Red Wings
|-
| 21 || November 26 || Colorado Avalanche
|-
| 22 || November 28 || @ Minnesota Wild
|-
| 23 || November 30 || Toronto Maple Leafs
|-
| 24 || December 2 || @ Vancouver Canucks
|-
| 25 || December 3 || Columbus Blue Jackets
|-
| 26 || December 5 || @ Colorado Avalanche
|-
| 27 || December 7 || Edmonton Oilers
|-
| 28 || December 9 || Vancouver Canucks
|-
| 29 || December 11 || Detroit Red Wings
|-
| 30 || December 14 || @ Edmonton Oilers
|-
| 31 || December 16 || @ Ottawa Senators
|-
| 32 || December 18 || @ Toronto Maple Leafs
|-
| 33 || December 21 || Edmonton Oilers
|-
| 34 || December 27 || Minnesota Wild
|-
| 35 || December 29 || Philadelphia Flyers
|-
| 36 || December 31 || Montreal Canadiens
|-
| 37 || January 3 || San Jose Sharks
|-
| 38 || January 6 || @ Nashville Predators
|-
| 39 || January 7 || @ Minnesota Wild
|-
| 40 || January 9 || @ Columbus Blue Jackets
|-
| 41 || January 11 || Dallas Stars
|-
| 42 || January 14 || Ottawa Senators
|-
| 43 || January 16 || @ Chicago Blackhawks
|-
| 44 || January 17 || @ Pittsburgh Penguins
|-
| 45 || January 19 || @ Detroit Red Wings
|-
| 46 || January 21 || New York Islanders
|-
| 47 || January 23 || Anaheim Mighty Ducks
|-
| 48 || January 25 || @ Dallas Stars
|-
| 49 || January 27 || @ Phoenix Coyotes
|-
| 50 || January 29 || New Jersey Devils
|-
| 51 || February 1 || San Jose Sharks
|-
| 52 || February 3 || New York Rangers
|-
| 53 || February 5 || Detroit Red Wings
|-
| 54 || February 7 || @ Edmonton Oilers
|-
| 55 || February 8 || Phoenix Coyotes
|-
| 56 || February 10 || Vancouver Canucks
|-
| 57 || February 16 || @ Los Angeles Kings
|-
| 58 || February 17 || @ San Jose Sharks
|-
| 59 || February 19 || @ Vancouver Canucks
|-
| 60 || February 24 || Minnesota Wild
|-
| 61 || February 26 || Boston Bruins
|-
| 62 || March 1 || @ St. Louis Blues
|-
| 63 || March 2 || @ Dallas Stars
|-
| 64 || March 4 || @ Chicago Blackhawks
|-
| 65 || March 6 || @ Atlanta Thrashers
|-
| 66 || March 8 || @ Nashville Predators
|-
| 67 || March 10 || Chicago Blackhawks
|-
| 68 || March 12 || St. Louis Blues
|-
| 69 || March 15 || Minnesota Wild
|-
| 70 || March 17 || Phoenix Coyotes
|-
| 71 || March 19 || @ Colorado Avalanche
|-
| 72 || March 20 || @ Minnesota Wild
|-
| 73 || March 22 || Washington Capitals
|-
| 74 || March 24 || Los Angeles Kings
|-
| 75 || March 26 || @ Montreal Canadiens
|-
| 76 || March 27 || @ Buffalo Sabres
|-
| 77 || March 30 || @ Columbus Blue Jackets
|-
| 78 || April 2 || Dallas Stars
|-
| 79 || April 4 || Los Angeles Kings
|-
| 80 || April 6 || @ Anaheim Mighty Ducks
|-
| 81 || April 7 || @ San Jose Sharks
|-
| 82 || April 10 || Colorado Avalanche
|-

Transactions
The Flames were involved in the following transactions from June 8, 2004, the day after the deciding game of the 2004 Stanley Cup Finals, through February 16, 2005, the day the  season was officially cancelled.

Trades

Players acquired

Players lost

Signings

Draft picks
Calgary's picks at the 2004 NHL Entry Draft held at Raleigh, North Carolina.  The Flames had the 24th overall pick in the draft, the first time they picked outside of the top 20 since 1995.

Farm teams

Lowell Lockmonsters
The Flames American Hockey League affiliate for the second year was the Lowell Lockmonsters, whom they shared with the Carolina Hurricanes.  The Lockmonsters finished with a franchise best record of 47–27–5–1, good for third in the Atlantic Division.  The Lockmonsters would be bounced from the playoffs in the second round, however.

Chuck Kobasew led Lowell with a franchise record 38 goals, while Brent Krahn recorded six shutouts in only 35 games as he played backup to Carolina's top goaltending prospect, Cam Ward.

Las Vegas Wranglers
The Las Vegas Wranglers were the Flames ECHL affiliate for the second year in  2004–05.  The second year club finished with a 31–33–8 record, missing the playoffs after finishing 7th in the West Division.

Notes

References

Calgary Flames seasons
Calgary Flames season, 2004-05
Cal